Zhairi is a surname. Notable people with the surname include:

Ben Zhairi (born 1992), Israeli footballer
Liroy Zhairi (born 1989), Israeli footballer